2MASS J11145133−2618235 (designation abbreviated to 2MASS 1114−2618),  or 2M1114−26, or 2M1114−2618, or 2MASS 1114−26, or 2MASS J1114−2618) is a nearby brown dwarf of spectral class T7.5, located in constellation Hydra at approximately 18 light-years from Earth.

Discovery
2MASS 1114−2618 was discovered in 2005 by C. G. Tinney et al. from the 2MASS Wide-Field T Dwarf Search (WFTS), based on observations obtained at the Anglo-Australian Telescope, Siding Spring, Australia. In 2005 Tinney et al. published a paper in The Astronomical Journal, where they presented discovery of five new brown dwarfs of spectral type T, among which also was 2MASS 1114−2618.

Distance
Trigonometric parallax of 2MASS 1114−2618, measured in 2012 by Dupuy & Liu under The Hawaii Infrared Parallax Program, is 0.1792 ± 0.0014 arcsec, corresponding to a distance 5.58 ± 0.04 pc, or 18.20 ± 0.14 ly.

The photometric distance estimate of 2MASS 1114−2618, published in its discovery paper in 2005, is 7 pc (22.8 ly). Spectrophotometric distance estimate by Kirkpatrick et al. (2012), is 6.6 pc (21.5 ly).

Proper motion
2MASS 1114−2618 has quite a large proper motion of 3043.2 mas/yr with position angle 262.75 degrees, indicating motion in south-west direction on the sky. At distance 18.20 ly (assuming parallax 179.2 ± 1.4 mas), corresponding tangential velocity is 80.56 km/s.

See also
The other four discoveries of brown dwarfs, presented in Tinney et al. (2005):
2MASS 0050−3322 (T7.5)
2MASS 0939−2448 (T8, binary brown dwarf)
2MASS 0949−1545 (T1)
2MASS 1122−3512 (T2)

Notes

References

Brown dwarfs
T-type stars
Hydra (constellation)
J11145133−2618235
?
TIC objects